Anastrangalia sanguinea is a species of beetle from family Cerambycidae.

References

Lepturinae
Beetles described in 1859